Beyond a Joke is a 2009 ITV3 documentary series exploring the social context of classic and contemporary British sitcoms. The documentary featured clips from the sitcoms and interviews with a variety of celebrities and experts, including John Cleese, Paul Nicholas, Tony Benn, Carla Lane, Jonathan Harvey, Don Warrington, Ian Lavender, Nina Myskow, Andrew Sachs, Edwina Currie and Vanessa Feltz. It was narrated by Dave Lamb.

Episodes

External links
Beyond a Joke at the British Comedy Guide

2009 British television series debuts
2009 British television series endings
2000s British documentary television series
ITV documentaries
ITV comedy
Television series by ITV Studios
English-language television shows